Charles Edgar Buckeridge (1864 – 11 May 1898) was an English church decorative artist and the son of Charles Buckeridge, a Gothic Revival architect.

Life and career
Born in Headington, Oxford in 1864, the son of Annie and Charles Buckeridge, a Gothic Revival architect, he trained with Burlison & Grylls, ecclesiastical decorators. He exhibited at the Royal Academy Summer Exhibition in 1882 with a painting of Hampton Court and became known for his religious works, described as a "highly esteemed painter in this field". He often painted in the style of Van Eyck.

He was employed by C. Hodgson Fowler, Arthur Blomfield, John Oldrid Scott, John Loughborough Pearson and Edmund Harold Sedding. His most important patron was George Frederick Bodley for whom he completed the decoration at St Martin-on-the-Hill, Scarborough, that had been started by Edward Burne-Jones and Morris & Co. in the 1860s.

He worked in partnership with Charles Stephen Floyce or Fleuss (c1857-1895), until the end of 1890. They advertised as 'panel and mural painters' and 'artists in stained glass'. Floyce later (1892) worked with Blomfield on the Royal Memorial Church of St George, Cannes.

Other projects included paintings (1894) for Pearson's chapel at St Antony's College, Oxford; the original architect of the nunnery had been his father.

The reredos formerly in St Mark's Church, Horsham, is now in St Mary's Church. It cost about £200. "The upper part of the reredos is in the form of a triptych. The framework is of oak, and the panels, gilt and coloured, are painted in oils, the work being of the Flemish school. The centre panel represents the adoration of the infant Jesus by the Virgin and St Joseph. The side panels bear figures of the four Evangelists. Sir Arthur Blomfield was the architect, and Messrs. Floyce and Buckeridge, of London, were the artists."

At St Mary Magdalene, Enfield, he painted the East Wall and the angels on the ceiling in the chancel (1897/8).

"The altar and reredos of the church of St. Nicholas, Rodmersham, Kent, have been exquisitely painted by Messrs. Buckeridge and Floyce". "It represents the best order of ecclesiastical art, viz., the 15th Century German, whilst the character of the ornament is founded on the old Norfolk work".

His masterpiece is probably the triptych (1892–93) for the architect Norman Shaw's All Saints' Church, Richard's Castle, Shropshire.

Personal life
Charles married Ellen Dunkley in Marylebone in 1888 and had one son, Albert (b 1881). In 1882 his address was given as 4, Duke Street, Portland Place and in 1891 Wilmot Place, St Pancras. He later lived at Mortimer Street, Marylebone. He died at 64 Agamemnon Road, West Hampstead in 1898, and is buried in Camden. According to Saint "In November 1894 .. his wife destroyed one of his largest paintings and fled".

Gallery

Works
Incomplete. (After Andrew Saint with additions)

References

1864 births
1898 deaths
19th-century British artists
19th-century English painters
Artists from Oxford
British stained glass artists and manufacturers
English male painters
Religious artists
19th-century English male artists